The Time Jumpers is the name of a Western swing band formed in 1998 by a group of Nashville studio musicians who enjoyed jamming together. Country star Vince Gill was a member of the group between 2010 and 2020. The 11–member group started playing occasional local gigs until they agreed to take a regular slot playing at the Station Inn, a venerable Nashville bluegrass venue. They later moved to a larger venue, Nashville's "3rd & Lindsley", and were called by Tennessean writer Juli Thanki, "One of the hottest shows in town". Some of their guest artists on the weekly live show have included Joe Walsh, Robert Plant, Norah Jones, Bonnie Raitt, Reba McEntire, Jimmy Buffett, Kings of Leon,  and Toby Keith. The group rarely travels, but in 2010 they performed at New York's Lincoln Center. In 2007, they recorded a live album entitled Jumpin' Time and in 2012 recorded The Time Jumpers.  At the 2017 Grammy Awards the group won "Best American Roots Song" for Vince Gill's composition "Kid Sister".

Band members
The group's lineup has changed frequently. Some of the musicians involved have included: 
 Brad Albin – bass
 Michael Blaustone – drums
 Robert Bowlin – fiddle
 Johnny Cox – steel guitar
 Dennis Crouch – bass
 Larry Franklin – fiddle
 Paul Franklin – steel guitar
 Vince Gill – vocals, guitar
 Doug (Ranger Doug) Green – vocals, guitar
 Adie Grey – vocals
 Aubrey Haynie – fiddle
 Hoot Hester – vocals
 John Hughey – steel guitar
 Kenny LeMasters – steel guitar, guitar
 Kenny Malone – drums
 Carolyn Martin – vocals
 Danny Parks – guitar
 Andy Reiss – guitar
 Dawn Sears – vocals 
 Kenny Sears – fiddle
 Joe Spivey – vocals, fiddle
 Jeff Taylor – vocals, accordion
 Billy Thomas – drums
 Rick Vanaugh – drums
 Wendy Moten - vocals

Discography

Albums

Music videos

Collaborations 
 Performed with Reba McEntire on the song "If You're Not Gone Too Long" from Coal Miner's Daughter: A Tribute To Loretta Lynn (2010).
 Performed with LeAnn Rimes on the song "Blue" from Lady & Gentlemen (2011).
 Performed with Vince Gill on the song "Buttermilk John" from Guitar Slinger (2011).
 Performed with Miranda Lambert on the song "All That's Left" from Platinum (2014).
 Performed with Asleep at the Wheel on the song "Faded Love" from Still the King: Celebrating the Music of Bob Wills and His Texas Playboys (2015).
 Performed with Willie Nelson on the album For the Good Times: A Tribute to Ray Price (2016).

Awards and nominations

Grammy Awards

|-
| style="text-align:center;" rowspan="2"| 2013
| "On The Outskirts of Town"
| Best Country Duo/Group Performance
| 
|-
| The Time Jumpers
| Best Country Album
| 
|-
| style="text-align:center;" rowspan="2"| 2017
| "Kid Sister"
| Best American Roots Song
| 
|-
| Kid Sister
| Best Americana Album
| 
|-
|}

References

External links 
The Time Jumpers

Country music groups from Tennessee
Musical groups from Nashville, Tennessee